Llandaff House is a historic home in Easton, Talbot County, Maryland, United States.  It is a -story irregular plan frame house built in 1877–78, in a combined Queen Anne and Eastlake style.  It features an asymmetrical front facade with a central entrance incorporated in a projecting two-story, two-bay pavilion distinguished by an open porch on the first floor.  Also on the property are a late-19th-century three-story combination water tower and windmill and an early-20th-century frame boathouse.  The grounds were professionally designed and executed by New York landscape architect Thomas Hogan.

Llandaff House was listed on the National Register of Historic Places in 2002.

References

External links
, including photo in 2001, at Maryland Historical Trust

Houses on the National Register of Historic Places in Maryland
Houses in Talbot County, Maryland
Queen Anne architecture in Maryland
Houses completed in 1878
National Register of Historic Places in Talbot County, Maryland